Equity Bank South Sudan Limited (EBSSL) is a commercial bank in South Sudan. The bank provides banking services to individuals and to small and medium business enterprises. It is one of the commercial banks licensed to operate in the country by the Bank of South Sudan, the central bank and national banking regulator.

Overview
In 2020, the bank had an asset value worth $89.24 million (SSP11.62 billion) and generated revenue worth $21.85 million (SSP 2.85 billion). Equity Bank South Sudan received the Bank of the Year South Sudan 2020 award by The Banker, during the Bank of the Year Awards 2020. As of August 2021, Equity Bank South Sudan had assets valued at US$107.32 million and recorded deposits worth US$70.03 million.

The bank rebranded in 2020 inline with the parent company Equity Group Holdings.

Equity Group Holdings Limited

In 2020, the bank had an asset value worth $89.24 million (SSP11.62 billion) and generated revenue worth $21.85 million (SSP 2.85 billion).
Equity Bank South Sudan received the Bank of the Year South Sudan 2020 award by The Banker, during the Bank of the Year Awards 2020.
As of August 2021, Equity Bank South Sudan had assets valued at US$107.32 million and recorded deposits worth US$70.03 million.

Equity Bank South Sudan is a subsidiary of Equity Group Holdings Limited (EGHL), a large financial services conglomerate, with an asset base estimated at over US$10.2 billion (KES:1.12  trillion), and customer deposits worth US$7.46 billion (KES:840.3 billion). EGHL has a customer base in excess of 14 million in the six East African countries that it serves, making it the largest commercial bank on the African continent, by customer numbers. The stock of the Equity Group Holdings Limited is listed on the Nairobi Stock Exchange, where it trades under the symbol EQTY. It is also cross-listed on the Uganda Securities Exchange under the symbol: EBL.

Ownership
Equity Bank South Sudan Limited is a 100% subsidiary of Equity Group Holdings Limited, a diversified financial services conglomerate, with subsidiaries in Kenya, Uganda, Tanzania, Rwanda, DRC, South Sudan and a representative office in Ethiopia. The shares of stock of the Group are traded on the Nairobi Stock Exchange and on the Uganda Securities Exchange.

Branch network
Equity Bank South Sudan Limited has its headquarters in South Sudan's capital city, Juba. The bank maintains branches in many of the country's major urban centers, including the following:

 Juba Branch - Ground Floor, Equity Plaza Juba (Main Branch)
 Bilpham Branch - SPLA Headquarters, Juba
 Hai Malakal Branch - Juba-Malakal Road, Malakal
 Yei Branch - Equity Building, Yei
 Yambio Branch - Equity Building, Yambio.
 Torit Branch - Torit
 Nimule Branch - Nimule
 SSBL Branch - Juba
 Kajo Keji Branch - Kajo Keji

See also
 Economy of South Sudan
 Banking in South Sudan
 List of banks in South Sudan

References

External links
 Website of Bank of South Sudan
 Website of Equity Bank South Sudan Limited
 Website of Equity Group Holdings Limited

Banks of South Sudan
Banks established in 2008
Companies based in Juba